The 2017 Unibet Masters was the fifth staging of the non-ranking Masters darts tournament, held by the Professional Darts Corporation (PDC). It was held from 27–29 January 2017 at the Arena MK in Milton Keynes, England.

Michael van Gerwen was the defending champion by beating Dave Chisnall 11–6 in 2016, and successfully defended his title, winning his third Masters title in a row, after defeating Gary Anderson 11–7 in the final.

Qualifiers
The Masters only features the top 16 players in the PDC Order of Merit. The following players comprised the top 16 of the PDC Order of Merit after the 2017 PDC World Darts Championship:

 Michael van Gerwen (winner)
 Gary Anderson (runner-up)
 Peter Wright (quarter-finals)
 Adrian Lewis (semi-finals)
 James Wade (first round)
 Phil Taylor (semi-finals)
 Dave Chisnall (first round)
 Mensur Suljović (quarter-finals)
 Jelle Klaasen (first round)
 Raymond van Barneveld (quarter-finals)
 Michael Smith (first round)
 Robert Thornton (quarter-finals)
 Kim Huybrechts (first round)
 Ian White (first round)
 Benito van de Pas (first round)
 Simon Whitlock (first round)

Prize money
The prize money is £200,000 in total. The prize money is the same as in 2016.

Draw

References

External links
Results at dartsdatabase.co.uk

Masters
Masters (darts)
Masters (darts)
Masters (darts)
Sport in Milton Keynes
2010s in Buckinghamshire